The FIDE World Chess Championship 1996 was a chess tournament held by FIDE to determine the World Chess Champion.

Background
At the time the World Chess Champion title was split.

In 1993, Nigel Short had qualified via FIDE's usual format to meet champion Garry Kasparov in a championship match. However, Kasparov and Short broke with FIDE and played under the auspices of a new organization which they had organized, the Professional Chess Association (PCA). Kasparov won this match to remain champion.

With its two top players withdrawn, FIDE awarded the two slots in its 1993 championship match to Anatoly Karpov and Jan Timman, both of whom had been defeated in earlier qualification rounds by Short. Karpov won the match to become the FIDE World Champion.

The FIDE World Chess Championship 1996 was FIDE's first since the 1993 split. Meanwhile, the PCA held its Classical World Chess Championship 1995, in which Kasparov defeated Viswanathan Anand to retain his title.

Many of the same players competed in both organization's qualifying events. However, Kasparov and Short did not compete in the FIDE event.

1993 Interzonal tournament
FIDE held an Interzonal tournament in Biel in July 1993, run as a 73 player, 13 round Swiss system tournament.

The top 10 from the Interzonal qualified for a Championship tournament. In the event of a tie break, players were ranked by the sum of their opponents' Elo ratings, excluding the lowest rating.

{| class="wikitable"
|+ 1993 FIDE Interzonal Tournament
|-
!  !! !! Rating !! 1 !! 2 !! 3 !! 4 !! 5 !! 6 !! 7 !! 8 !! 9 !! 10 !! 11 !! 12 !! 13 !! Total !! Tie break
|- style="background:#ccffcc;"
| 1 || align=left| || 2670 || =35 || +49 || =6 || +39 || =3 || +43 || =2 || +10 || +17 || =5 || =13 || =9 || =7 || 9 || 
|- style="background:#ccffcc;"
| 2 || align=left| || 2525 || =51 || =41 || +71 || +31 || +26 || =13 || =1 || =6 || =4 || =7 || +17 || =8 || =3 || 8½ || 31545
|- style="background:#ccffcc;"
| 3 || align=left| || 2645 || +12 || =25 || +47 || =28 || =1 || =16 || +32 || =4 || +6 || =17 || =5 || =7 || =2 || 8½ || 31470
|- style="background:#ccffcc;"
| 4 || align=left| || 2645 || +58 || =43 || +45 || +8 || -10 || =6 || +24 || =3 || =2 || =16 || +26 || =5 || =9 || 8½ || 31390
|- style="background:#ccffcc;"
| 5 || align=left| || 2630 || -44 || +60 || -22 || +68 || +62 || +65 || +28 || +9 || =7 || =1 || =3 || =4 || =6 || 8½ || 31345
|- style="background:#ccffcc;"
| 6 || align=left| || 2605 || +67 || =44 || =1 || =36 || +48 || =4 || +23 || =2 || -3 || =11 || +29 || +13 || =5 || 8½ || 31340
|- style="background:#ccffcc;"
| 7 || align=left| || 2685 || =49 || +71 || =31 || +55 || +42 || +24 || =10 || -17 || =5 || =2 || +21 || =3 || =1 || 8½ || 31285
|- style="background:#ccffcc;"
| 8 || align=left| || 2620 || +26 || +62 || =17 || -4 || =22 || =21 || +33 || =16 || =9 || =15 || +27 || =2 || +24 || 8½ || 31280
|- style="background:#ccffcc;"
| 9 || align=left| || 2710 || -45 || +19 || =35 || +38 || +55 || +37 || =17 || -5 || =8 || +31 || +16 || =1 || =4 || 8½ || 31240
|- style="background:#ccffcc;"
| 10 || align=left| || 2725 || =16 || =22 || +44 || +25 || +4 || =17 || =7 || -1 || =21 || =27 || =18 || +28 || =11 || 8 || 31435
|-
| 11 || align=left| || 2655 || =18 || =35 || =38 || =45 || =41 || =36 || +42 || +39 || =13 || =6 || =24 || +15 || =10 || 8 || 31305
|-
| 12 || align=left| || 2555 || -3 || +70 || -39 || +71 || =31 || =56 || -14 || +55 || =20 || +52 || =51 || +40 || +32 || 8 || 31275
|-
| 13 || align=left| || 2685 || =65 || +53 || =32 || =22 || +47 || =2 || =16 || =29 || =11 || +23 || =1 || -6 || +21 || 8 || 31195
|-
| 14 || align=left| || 2705 || =22 || =16 || =21 || =65 || =25 || =47 || +12 || =37 || =23 || =29 || +33 || =24 || +27 || 8 || 31125
|-
| 15 || align=left| || 2610 || +66 || =23 || +57 || -17 || =21 || =22 || =37 || =27 || +36 || =8 || +35 || -11 || +30 || 8 || 31030
|-
| 16 || align=left| || 2585 || =10 || =14 || =40 || +44 || +56 || =3 || =13 || =8 || +29 || =4 || -9 || =18 || =20 || 7½ || 31855
|-
| 17 || align=left| || 2660 || +38 || +39 || =8 || +15 || =24 || =10 || =9 || +7 || -1 || =3 || -2 || =21 || =18 || 7½ || 31580
|-
| 18 || align=left| || 2570 || =11 || =29 || +20 || -37 || =50 || -33 || +70 || +43 || =28 || +45 || =10 || =16 || =17 || 7½ || 31515
|-
| 19 || align=left| || 2460 || =47 || -9 || +53 || +33 || =29 || -26 || =56 || +59 || -31 || +46 || =37 || +45 || =22 || 7½ || 31140
|-
| 20 || align=left| || 2630 || =34 || =46 || -18 || =27 || +58 || =41 || -35 || +57 || =12 || +43 || =31 || +26 || =16 || 7½ || 30850
|-
| 21 || align=left| || 2570 || +40 || -24 || =14 || +52 || =15 || =8 || +43 || =31 || =10 || +22 || -7 || =17 || -13 || 7 || 31795
|-
| 22 || align=left| || 2585 || =14 || =10 || +5 || =13 || =8 || =15 || =31 || =40 || +52 || -21 || -28 || +56 || =19 || 7 || 31700
|-
| 23 || align=left| || 2575 || +63 || =15 || =51 || =56 || +36 || =28 || -6 || +24 || =14 || -13 || =40 || =31 || =33 || 7 || 31625
|-
| 24 || align=left| || 2605 || +69 || +21 || =28 || +43 || =17 || -7 || -4 || -23 || +44 || +39 || =11 || =14 || -8 || 7 || 31465
|-
| 25 || align=left| || 2595 || +70 || =3 || =56 || -10 || =14 || -40 || =46 || =34 || =38 || +65 || -30 || +63 || +51 || 7 || 31415
|-
| 26 || align=left| || 2510 || -8 || +63 || +41 || +51 || -2 || +19 || -29 || +32 || =35 || +40 || -4 || -20 || =28 || 7 || 31405
|-
| 27 || align=left| || 2590 || -71 || +59 || -42 || =20 || +61 || +52 || =40 || =15 || +56 || =10 || -8 || +38 || -14 || 7 || 31360
|-
| 28 || align=left| || 2625 || +30 || +42 || =24 || =3 || =37 || =23 || -5 || -35 || =18 || +41 || +22 || -10 || =26 || 7 || 31225
|-
| 29 || align=left| || 2635 || =46 || =18 || =58 || +35 || =19 || =42 || +26 || =13 || -16 || =14 || -6 || +43 || =31 || 7 || 31120
|-
| 30 || align=left| || 2535 || -28 || =68 || +72 || =50 || -39 || -51 || +62 || +65 || =32 || =36 || +25 || +37 || -15 || 7 || 30985
|-
| 31 || align=left| || 2605 || +60 || =57 || =7 || -2 || =12 || +55 || =22 || =21 || +19 || -9 || =20 || =23 || =29 || 7 || 30980
|-
| 32 || align=left| || 2605 || +59 || =55 || =13 || -42 || +45 || +39 || -3 || -26 || =30 || =51 || +49 || +35 || -12 || 7 || 30970
|-
| 33 || align=left| || 2605 || -55 || =61 || +49 || -19 || +34 || +18 || -8 || +51 || =45 || =35 || -14 || +47 || =23 || 7 || 30930
|-
| 34 || align=left| || 2535 || =20 || -48 || =68 || =46 || -33 || +69 || =57 || =25 || =47 || =42 || +65 || =36 || +45 || 7 || 30880
|-
| 35 || align=left| || 2575 || =1 || =11 || =9 || -29 || +46 || =48 || +20 || +28 || =26 || =33 || -15 || -32 || =38 || 6½ || 31480
|-
| 36 || align=left| || 2520 || =48 || =37 || +62 || =6 || -23 || =11 || =38 || +41 || -15 || =30 || =52 || =34 || =40 || 6½ || 31260
|-
| 37 || align=left| || 2605 || =54 || =36 || +46 || +18 || =28 || -9 || =15 || =14 || -40 || +56 || =19 || -30 || =41 || 6½ || 31165
|-
| 38 || align=left| || 2575 || -17 || +67 || =11 || -9 || +69 || =50 || =36 || -56 || =25 || +44 || +39 || -27 || =35 || 6½ || 31155
|-
| 39 || align=left| || 2595 || +64 || -17 || +12 || -1 || +30 || -32 || +65 || -11 || +42 || -24 || -38 || =48 || +61 || 6½ || 31150
|-
| 40 || align=left| || 2660 || -21 || +66 || =16 || +57 || -43 || +25 || =27 || =22 || +37 || -26 || =23 || -12 || =36 || 6½ || 30835
|-
| 41 || align=left| || 2590 || =72 || =2 || -26 || +73 || =11 || =20 || =48 || -36 || +66 || -28 || +61 || =51 || =37 || 6½ || 30735
|-
| 42 || align=left| || 2585 || +74* || -28 || +27 || +32 || -7 || =29 || -11 || =48 || -39 || =34 || =46 || =52 || =49 || 6 || 31305
|-
| 43 || align=left| || 2595 || +68 || =4 || +48 || -24 || +40 || -1 || -21 || -18 || +59 || -20 || +66 || -29 || =50 || 6 || 31195
|-
| 44 || align=left| || 2535 || +5 || =6 || -10 || -16 || =57 || +62 || +50 || -52 || -24 || -38 || =67 || =58 || +68 || 6 || 31130
|-
| 45 || align=left| || 2585 || +9 || =50 || -4 || =11 || -32 || =70 || +60 || +47 || =33 || -18 || +48 || -19 || -34 || 6 || 31090
|-
| 46 || align=left| || 2540 || =29 || =20 || -37 || =34 || -35 || +73 || =25 || +50 || =48 || -19 || =42 || =62 || =47 || 6 || 31040
|-
| 47 || align=left| || 2600 || =19 || +54 || -3 || +61 || -13 || =14 || =51 || -45 || =34 || =50 || +55 || -33 || =46 || 6 || 30995
|-
| 48 || align=left| || 2620 || =36 || +34 || -43 || +58 || -6 || =35 || =41 || =42 || =46 || =49 || -45 || =39 || =52 || 6 || 30985
|-
| 49 || align=left| || 2580 || =7 || -1 || -33 || =60 || =70 || +66 || =55 || =58 || +53 || =48 || -32 || =50 || =42 || 6 || 30910
|-
| 50 || align=left| || 2610 || +61 || =45 || -55 || =30 || =18 || =38 || -44 || -46 || +63 || =47 || =56 || =49 || =43 || 6 || 30910
|-
| 51 || align=left| || 2625 || =2 || +72 || =23 || -26 || -65 || +30 || =47 || -33 || +58 || =32 || =12 || =41 || -25 || 6 || 30840
|-
| 52 || align=left| || 2640 || -57 || =69 || +73 || -21 || +63 || -27 || +53 || +44 || -22 || -12 || =36 || =42 || =48 || 6 || 30800
|-
| 53 || align=left| || 2535 || =56 || -13 || -19 || -69 || +72 || +71 || -52 || +64 || -49 || =59 || -63 || bye || +66 || 6 || 30320
|-
| 54 || align=left| || 2475 || =37 || -47 || -65 || =67 || -73 || =68 || +69 || =71 || =57 || -66 || bye || +59 || =63 || 6 || 30105
|-
| 55 || align=left| || 2485 || +33 || =32 || +50 || -7 || -9 || -31 || =49 || -12 || +71 || =62 || -47 || =68 || =56 || 5½ || 30935
|-
| 56 || align=left| || 2625 || =53 || +65 || =25 || =23 || -16 || =12 || =19 || +38 || -27 || -37 || =50 || -22 || =55 || 5½ || 30880
|-
| 57 || align=left| || 2540 || +52 || =31 || -15 || -40 || =44 || =59 || =34 || -20 || =54 || =58 || =68 || =66 || =62 || 5½ || 30820
|-
| 58 || align=left| || 2560 || -4 || +64 || =29 || -48 || -20 || =67 || +72 || =49 || -51 || =57 || =59 || =44 || =60 || 5½ || 30690
|-
| 59 || align=left| || 2485 || -32 || -27 || +64 || -62 || +68 || =57 || +63 || -19 || -43 || =53 || =58 || -54 || bye || 5½ || 30505
|-
| 60 || align=left| || 2475 || -31 || -5 || =66 || =49 || =71 || +61 || -45 || =68 || -65 || bye || =62 || =64 || =58 || 5½ || 30335
|-
| 61 || align=left| || 2500 || -50 || =33 || +69 || -47 || -27 || -60 || -68 || +73 || bye || +64 || -41 || +67 || -39 || 5½ || 30325
|-
| 62 || align=left| || 2590 || +73 || -8 || -36 || +59 || -5 || -44 || -30 || =67 || +70 || =55 || =60 || =46 || =57 || 5½ || 30285
|-
| 63 || align=left| || 2650 || -23 || -26 || +67 || =70 || -52 || =64 || -59 || +72 || -50 || +73 || +53 || -25 || =54 || 5½ || 30225
|-
| 64 || align=left| || 2455 || -39 || -58 || -59 || bye || =66 || =63 || +73 || -53 || =68 || -61 || +70 || =60 || =65 || 5½ || 30200
|-
| 65 || align=left| || 2575 || =13 || -56 || +54 || =14 || +51 || -5 || -39 || -30 || +60 || -25 || -34 || =69 || =64 || 5 || 30965
|-
| 66 || align=left| || 2495 || -15 || -40 || =60 || =72 || =64 || -49 || +67 || +70 || -41 || +54 || -43 || =57 || -53 || 5 || 30435
|-
| 67 || align=left| || 2465 || -6 || -38 || -63 || =54 || bye || =58 || -66 || =62 || +69 || =68 || =44 || -61 || =72 || 5 || 30330
|-
| 68 || align=left| || 2430 || -43 || =30 || =34 || -5 || -59 || =54 || +61 || =60 || =64 || =67 || =57 || =55 || -44 || 5 || 30255
|-
| 69 || align=left| || 2485 || -24 || =52 || -61 || +53 || -38 || -34 || -54 || bye || -67 || =72 || =73 || =65 || +71 || 5 || 30070
|-
| 70 || align=left| || 2455 || -25 || -12 || bye || =63 || =49 || =45 || -18 || -66 || -62 || +71 || -64 || =72 || =73 || 4½ || 30270
|-
| 71 || align=left| || 2330 || +27 || -7 || -2 || -12 || =60 || -53 || bye || =54 || -55 || -70 || =72 || +73 || -69 || 4½ || 30110
|-
| 72 || align=left| || 2410 || =41 || -51 || -30 || =66 || -53 || bye || -58 || -63 || -73 || =69 || =71 || =70 || =67 || 4 || 30170
|-
| 73 || align=left| || 2425 || -62 || bye || -52 || -41 || +54 || -46 || -64 || -61 || +72 || -63 || =69 || -71 || =70 || 4 || 30140
|-
| 74 || align=left| || 2320 || -42* ||  ||  ||  ||  ||  ||  ||  ||  ||  ||  ||  ||  || 0 || 
|}

Esam Aly Ahmed forfeited his first-round game against Pigusov and was dropped from the tournament.

1994–96 Championship tournament
The top 10 from the Interzonal were joined by 1993 FIDE World Champion Anatoly Karpov, 1993 FIDE runner-up Jan Timman, and 1993 Candidates semi-finalist Artur Yusupov. (The other 1993 semi-finalist was the excluded Nigel Short).

The first round matches were held in Wijk aan Zee in January 1994, and the second round matches and semifinals in Sanghi Nagar in July–August 1994 and February 1995, respectively. If tied after the specified number of games (which happened only in the Kamsky-Anand match), rapid chess games were played as tie breaks.

The format was a departure from all previous world championships, in that the reigning champion (Karpov) was not seeded directly into a championship match. Instead, he joined the competition at the semifinal stage.

1996 Championship final

The final was held in Elista, Russia in June–July 1996 and played as best of 20 games.

{| class="wikitable" style="text-align:center"
|+FIDE World Chess Championship Match 1996
|-
! !! Rating !! 1 !! 2 !! 3 !! 4 !! 5 !! 6 !! 7 !! 8 !! 9 !! 10 !! 11 !! 12 !! 13 !! 14 !! 15 !! 16 !! 17 !! 18 !! Total
|-
| align=left |  || 2770
| 1 ||style="background:black; color:white"| 0 || ½ ||style="background:black; color:white"| 1 || ½ ||style="background:black; color:white"| 1 || 1 ||style="background:black; color:white"| ½ || 1 ||style="background:black; color:white"| 0 || ½ ||style="background:black; color:white"| ½ || ½ ||style="background:black; color:white"| 1 || ½ ||style="background:black; color:white"| 0 || ½ ||style="background:black; color:white"| ½ || 10½
|-
| align=left |  || 2735
|style="background:black; color:white"| 0 || 1 ||style="background:black; color:white"| ½ || 0 ||style="background:black; color:white"| ½ || 0 ||style="background:black; color:white"| 0 || ½ ||style="background:black; color:white"| 0 || 1 
|style="background:black; color:white"| ½ || ½ ||style="background:black; color:white"| ½ || 0 ||style="background:black; color:white"| ½ || 1 ||style="background:black; color:white"| ½ || ½ || 7½
|}

Karpov won and retained his title.

References

Further reading

1996
Chess in Russia
Chess in India
Chess in the Netherlands
Chess in Switzerland
1993 in chess
1994 in chess
1995 in chess
1996 in chess